Janvier v Sweeney [1919] 2 KB 316 is a decision by the English Court of Appeal dealing with liability for nervous shock caused by an intentional act.

Facts 

A private detective told a woman that he was a police detective and that she was wanted for communicating with a German spy. He did this in order to obtain certain information about her employer. The woman suffered shock and nervous illness as a result of this statement.

Judgment 

Applying the rule in Wilkinson v. Downton, the court ruled that the detective was liable for the nervous shock to the plaintiff, who had an even stronger case than in Wilkinson v Downton, since there was a clear intention to frighten the victim in order to unlawfully obtain information.

See also 
Wilkinson v. Downton
Nervous shock (English Law)

English tort case law
1919 in case law
English psychiatric injury case law
Court of Appeal (England and Wales) cases
1919 in British law